Gerona may refer to:
 Gerona, Spain, a city in Catalonia, Spain
 Gerona, Tarlac, a town in the Philippines 
 Gerona, Uruguay, a village in Maldonado, Uruguay
 Gerona, a fictional planet in the Star Wars franchise

See also
 Girona (disambiguation)
 Nueva Gerona